The New Zealand General Service Medal 1992 (Non-Warlike) (NZGSM 1992) is a New Zealand campaign medal, authorised in 1992, for award to New Zealanders who have served in peacekeeping operations for which no separate UN medal was issued.

Each operation covered by the medal was represented by a clasp on the ribbon; twelve clasps have been issued to date, covering operations from 1954 to the present.  The medal is never issued without a clasp.

The NZGSM 1992 was issued in two varieties – one for warlike service, and another for non-warlike service.  Non-warlike operations were commemorated by this medal, operational deployments were commemorated by the NZGSM 1992 (Warlike) in silver.

This medal was replaced in 2002 by the New Zealand General Service Medal 2002 – all operations commencing on after 1 January 2000 will be recognised by awards of this new medal.  However the NZGSM 1992 will continue to be issued with the clasp Sinai for so long as that deployment continues, all other operations recognised by this medal have now ceased.

Clasps
 Korea 1954–57
 Thailand
 Sinai
 Indian Ocean
 Peshawar
 Iraq
 Somalia
 Mozambique
 Cambodia
 Rwanda
 Arabian Gulf
 Bougainville
 Korea 1958–2000

Notes

Bibliography
 Mackay, J and Mussel, J (eds) – Medals Yearbook – 2005, (2004), Token Publishing.

External links
 New Zealand Defence Force – Medal information page
 New Zealand Defence Force – Text of the Royal authorisation warrant
 New Zealand Defence Force – Amendment to Royal authorisation warrant

New Zealand campaign medals